Roujan is a commune in the Hérault department in the Occitanie region in southern France, about 22 km north of Beziers.

Sights
Cassan Abbey, an 18th-century historical monument is located in the commune on the road to Faugères.

Population

Personalities
 Jules Roucairol, victim of Napoléon III's coup d'état

See also
Communes of the Hérault department

References

Communes of Hérault